Megarthria peterseni is a species of moth in the family Pyralidae. It was described by Philipp Christoph Zeller in 1881. It is found in Costa Rica, Cuba, Mexico, Belize, Guatemala, Panama, Colombia and Brazil (Rondônia).

References

Moths described in 1881
Phycitinae
Moths of North America
Moths of South America
Taxa named by Philipp Christoph Zeller